Albert Cabestany  (born 26 June 1980 in Tarragona, Spain), is an International motorcycle trials rider. He was Spanish Outdoor Trials Champion in 2002, and Indoor Champion in 2002, 2003 and 2006.

Biography
Cabestany competed in his first international competition in 1997 at the age of 16, riding his Beta in the Portuguese round of the FIM Trial European Championship and finishing in 8th place. At the second round in Spain he narrowly missed the podium with a 4th-place finish. After competing for the full season he ended the year 7th in the standings. He also rode in the Spanish round of the FIM Trial World Championship scoring 2 points for a 14th-place finish.

In 2002 Cabestany took the Spanish Championship Title after a season long battle with Adam Raga. It came down to the final round in Terrassa with Cabestany finishing 2nd and Raga finishing 4th giving Cabestany the title with 131 points to 129 for the season.

European Trials Championship Career

World Trials Championship Career

Related Reading
FIM Trial European Championship
FIM Trial World Championship
Scottish Six Days Trial

References 

1980 births
Living people
Spanish motorcycle racers
Motorcycle racers from Catalonia
Motorcycle trials riders